Alexander Proyas (Greek: Αλέξανδρος Πρόγιας; born 23 September 1963) is an Australian filmmaker of Greek descent. Proyas is best known for directing the films The Crow (1994), Dark City (1998), I, Robot (2004), Knowing (2009), and Gods of Egypt (2016).

Early life
Proyas was born in Alexandria, present-day Egypt, to ethnic Greek parents. His father's family had lived in Egypt for many generations, and his mother's family were from Cyprus. He moved to Sydney when he was three. At 17, he attended the Australian Film, Television, and Radio School, and began directing music videos shortly after. He moved to Los Angeles in the United States to further his career, working on MTV music videos and TV commercials.

Career
Proyas' first feature film was the independent science fiction thriller Spirits of the Air, Gremlins of the Clouds, which was nominated for two Australian Film Institute awards in 1988, for costume design and production design and which won a Special Prize at the 1990 Yubari International Fantastic Film Festival.

Next, Proyas directed the 1994 superhero fantasy thriller The Crow starring Brandon Lee. Lee was killed in an accident during filming, only eight days before the completion of the film on 31 March 1993. After Lee's death, Proyas and his producers decided to complete the film, partially rewriting the script and using a stunt double and special effects to film the remaining scenes. The Crow was released in May 1994 and was a box office and critical success.

Proyas then wrote, directed and produced the 1998 science fiction thriller Dark City, which received positive critical reception and won several awards but was a commercial disappointment. In 2004, he directed I, Robot starring Will Smith, a science fiction film suggested by the Isaac Asimov short story compilation I, Robot and was a box office success despite mixed reviews.

Proyas' next film, the thriller Knowing starring Nicolas Cage, began production in Melbourne in March 2008 and opened in North America in March 2009.

His next project was meant to be an action-oriented adaptation of John Milton's 17th-century Christian epic poem Paradise Lost, starring Bradley Cooper. Both Proyas and Cooper were on hand to debut concept art at ComicCon 2011, but the project was ultimately cancelled over budgetary concerns related to the effects.

Proyas also worked with John Foxx on the creation of Parallel Lives, a joint project.

In late 2012, it was revealed that Proyas was slated as director of the science fiction thriller film adaptation of the Daniel H. Wilson novel Amped.

Proyas directed Gods of Egypt, starring Nikolaj Coster-Waldau, and co-written by Matt Sazama and Burk Sharpless. The film was critically panned upon its release in 2016 and bombed at the box office.

Other ventures
In 2019 Alex Proyas founded a new production studio in Sydney, Australia, under the name of Heretic Foundation. In August 2021 Proyas has announced that he is developing a new video platform titled "VidiVerse" for independent filmmakers, as an alternative to YouTube.

Personal life
Proyas has long been married to artist Catherine Linsley, who worked in the Art Department for Proyas's first feature film, Spirits of the Air, Gremlins of the Clouds. She has also worked in various capacities on short subjects and animations produced by or written by Proyas.  Linsley was also listed in the final credits of his film Knowing under the section "The producers wish to thank...".

Filmography

Feature films

Short films

Music videos
"Ricky's Hand" – Fad Gadget (1980) w/Salik Silverstein
"Flicker" – Fetus Productions (1983)
"In Your Eyes" – Dropbears (1985)
"Kiss the Dirt" – INXS (1986)
"Don't Dream It's Over" – Crowded House (1986) 
"Holiday" – The Other Ones (1987)
"Rhythm of Love" – Yes (1987)
"Better Be Home Soon" – Crowded House (1988)
"Magic Touch" – Mike Oldfield (1988)
"Bring Down the Moon" – Boy Meets Girl (1989)
"Nineteen Forever" – Joe Jackson (1989)
"Mysteries of Love" – Alphaville (1989)
"When We Dance" – Sting (1994)

Awards and nominations

ARIA Music Awards
The ARIA Music Awards is an annual awards ceremony that recognises excellence, innovation, and achievement across all genres of Australian music. They commenced in 1987. 

! 
|-
|rowspan="2" | 1987
| Alex Proyas for "Don't Dream It's Over" (Crowded House)
|rowspan="2" | Best Video
| 
|rowspan="2" |  
|-
| Alex Proyas for "Kiss the Dirt" (INXS)
| 
|-

References

External links

Alex Proyas Discusses Dark City Sequel at AMCtv.com

1963 births
ARIA Award winners
Australian film directors
Australian film producers
Australian music video directors
Australian screenwriters
Australian people of Greek Cypriot descent
Australian people of Greek descent
Living people
Science fiction film directors
Television commercial directors
People from Alexandria
Writers from Sydney
Egyptian emigrants to Australia
Egyptian people of Greek descent